Bamboo Harvester (1949–1970) was the American Saddlebred/part-Arabian horse that portrayed Mister Ed on the 1961–1966 comedy series of the same name. Foaled in 1949, the gelding was trained by Will Rogers' protégé, Les Hilton. He was born in the Los Angeles area but sources disagree as to whether his birthplace was in El Monte or at Harvester Farms in Chatsworth, California.

In 1968, two years after the cancellation of Mister Ed, at the age of 19, Bamboo began to suffer from a variety of age related ailments, including kidney problems and arthritis. He was euthanized in 1970.

A second palomino horse named Pumpkin (alternatively Punkin), which had posed for still pictures used in press kits for the show and some personal appearances, survived until 1979. After Bamboo Harvester's death, the second horse was unofficially known as Mister Ed.

Pedigree

Death 

By 1968, Bamboo Harvester was suffering from a variety of health problems. Controversy surrounds the story of his demise, and there are at least two separate versions of what happened, both from plausible sources which might reasonably be expected to have the correct story.  

In one version, he was euthanized in 1970 with no publicity, and buried at Snodgrass Farm in Oklahoma.
However, a different version was given by Alan Young. Young wrote that he had frequently visited his former co-star in retirement. He states that Mr. Ed died from an inadvertent tranquilizer administered while he was "in retirement" in a stable in Burbank, California, where he lived with his trainer, Lester Hilton. 

Young says Hilton was out of town visiting relatives and a temporary caregiver might have seen Ed rolling on the ground, struggling to get up. Young said Ed was a heavy horse and he was not always strong enough to get back on his feet without struggling. The theory is that the caregiver thought the horse was in distress and administered a tranquilizer and for unknown reasons the horse died within hours. The remains were cremated and scattered by Hilton in the Los Angeles area at a spot known only to him.

In this version it was a different horse that died in Oklahoma in February 1979 which widely thought to be Bamboo Harvester, but instead this horse was merely one that posed for the still pictures of "Mr. Ed" used by the production company for the show's press kits. After Bamboo Harvester's death in 1970, this horse was unofficially known as Mister Ed, which led to him being reported as such (including sardonic comments on Saturday Night Live's Weekend Update) following his own death.

Young said when the Oklahoma horse death story came out in 1979, he knew it was not the real Mr. Ed, but did not have the heart to "shatter their illusions" that the horse being memorialized was not the real Mr. Ed. He believes it was a horse used for early publicity photos.

Whether or not it was the real Bamboo Harvester, the horse was laid to rest in 1970, on the farm at Snodgrass Farm in Tahlequah, Oklahoma, with no marker. It wasn't until summer 1990 when Mister Ed fans of Oklahoma dedicated a standing granite gravestone to honor the grounds of his grave, though the epitaph uses his stage name and image as 'Mr. Ed', and does not mention his death date of 1970.

See also
 List of historical horses

References

External links 
 
 Bamboo Harvester at AllBreedPedigrees.com

Horse actors
1949 animal births
1970 animal deaths
Horses in film and television
Individual Arabian and part-Arabian horses